St. John's Rural East is a parliamentary constituency in Saint John Parish, Antigua and Barbuda.

The constituency has 4,474 registered electors and 14 polling districts. Its counting centre is at the St. John's Catholic Primary, on Old Parham Road.

The constituency is represented by Maria Browne, and was once the seat of former prime minister Lester Bird.

Elections

References 

Constituencies of Antigua and Barbuda
St. John's, Antigua and Barbuda